The scuppernong  is a large variety of muscadine (Vitis rotundifolia), a species of grape native to the Southern United States. It is usually a greenish or bronze color and is similar in appearance and texture to a white grape, but rounder and larger and first known as the 'big white grape'.  The grape is commonly known as the "scuplin" in some areas of the Deep South.  It is also known as the "scufalum", "scupanon", "scupadine", "scuppernine", "scupnun", or "scufadine" in some parts of the South. The scuppernong is the state fruit of North Carolina.

History

The name comes from the Scuppernong River in North Carolina mainly along the coastal plain. It was first mentioned as a "white grape" in a written logbook by the Florentine explorer Giovanni de Verrazzano while exploring the Cape Fear River Valley in 1524. He wrote "...Many vines growing naturally there...". Sir Walter Raleigh's explorers, the captains Philip Amadas and Arthur Barlowe, wrote in 1584 that North Carolina's coast was "...so full of grapes as the very beating and surge of the sea overflowed them...in all the world, the like abundance is not to be found." He may have been referring to Sargasso seaweed from coral reefs, which can be seen washed up on shore after a major storm off the NC coast. The seaweed has berrylike gas-filled bladders looking much like grapes to keep the fronds afloat. However, in 1585, Governor Ralph Lane, when describing North Carolina to Raleigh, stated that "We have discovered the main to be the goodliest soil under the cope of heaven, so abounding with sweet trees that bring rich and pleasant, grapes of such greatness, yet wild, as France, Spain, nor Italy hath no greater...".

It was first cultivated during the 17th century, particularly in Tyrell County, North Carolina. Isaac Alexander found it while hunting along the banks of a stream feeding into Scuppernong Lake in 1755; it is mentioned in the North Carolina official state toast. The name itself traces back to the Algonquian word ascopo meaning "sweet bay tree".

Cultivation

The fruit grows where temperatures seldom fall below 10° Fahrenheit (–12 °C). Injury can occur where winter temperatures drop below 0° Fahrenheit (–18 °C). Some cultivars such as Magnolia, Carlos, and Sterling survive north to Virginia and west to the Blue Ridge Mountain foothills. Muscadines have a high tolerance to diseases and pests. Over 100 years of breeding has resulted in several bronze cultivars such as Carlos, Doreen, Magnolia and Triumph, that are distinguished by being perfect flowered (male and female flower parts together) from the Scuppernong variety with only female flower parts.

The "Mother Vine"

Possibly the oldest cultivated grapevine in the world is the 400-year-old scuppernong "Mother Vine" growing on Roanoke Island, North Carolina.

Use of scuppernong in the arts

In music 
Scuppernong is a piece for piano in three movements by John Wesley Work III

‘’Broomstraw Philosophers and Scuppernong Wine’’ is a song written by country artist, Larry Jon Wilson

In literature 
Scuppernongs are mentioned in chapters  4 and 22 of To Kill a Mockingbird.

Scuppernong is also mentioned in Charles W. Chesnutt'''s 1899 collection of short stories The Conjure Woman 

They are also mentioned by the name "scupadine" in chapter 6 of Salvage the Bones.

"In The Scuppernongs" is the title of a particularly terrifying chapter in Go Tell The Bees That I Am Gone, the ninth book in the Outlander series by Diana Gabaldon.

In the movie The Bad Seed, Rhoda Penmark talks about the "scuppernong arbor" in the family's yard.

Scuppernongs are mentioned in Chapter 25 of MacKinlay Kantor's Civil War novel Andersonville''.

References

External links 

 VisitNC.com North Carolina's Toast To The MotherVine
 About.com Southern U.S. cuisine: muscadines & scuppernongs 
 CharlestonWine.com History of the Muscadine - The South’s Own Grape

Grape varieties
Crops originating from the United States
Cuisine of the Southern United States
American wine
Symbols of North Carolina